Båstad Municipality (Båstads kommun) is a municipality in Skåne County in South Sweden, located in Sweden. Its seat is located in the town of Båstad.

The present municipality was established in 1971 when the market town (köping) Båstad was amalgamated with the surrounding rural municipalities. One parish was transferred from Halland County.

Localities
There are 6 localities in Båstad Municipality.

In the table they are listed according to the size of the population as of December 31, 2005. The municipal seat is in bold characters.

Elections
Below are the results since the 1973 municipal reform listed. Between 1988 and 1998 the Sweden Democrats' results were not published by the SCB due to the party's small size nationwide. "Turnout" denotes the percentage of the electorate casting a ballot, but "Votes" only applies to valid ballots cast.

Riksdag

Blocs

This lists the relative strength of the socialist and centre-right blocs since 1973, but parties not elected to the Riksdag are inserted as "other", including the Sweden Democrats results from 1988 to 2006, but also the Christian Democrats pre-1991 and the Greens in 1982, 1985 and 1991. The sources are identical to the table above. The coalition or government mandate marked in bold formed the government after the election. New Democracy got elected in 1991 but are still listed as "other" due to the short lifespan of the party. "Elected" is the total number of percentage points from the municipality that went to parties who were elected to the Riksdag.

Hallandian ridge

Extending through the municipality, marking the border to the province Halland, is the ridge of Hallandia, or Hallandsåsen. It is one of the highest points in the otherwise flat-terrained Scania, with a height of 226 meters.

The ridge reached the public eye in 1997, when the construction of the Hallandsås Tunnel through the ridge caused fishes in the streams to die and cows grazing on the ridge to become paralyzed due to the poisonous substance acrylamide used by the digging company to counteract the high level of groundwater in the ridge.

References
Sources
Article Båstad from Nordisk Familjebok (in Swedish only)
Statistics Sweden
Citations

External links

Båstad Municipality - Official site
Båstad Tourism
Coat of arms

Municipalities of Skåne County
Municipalities in the Øresund Region